There are at least two Crooked Islands:

Crooked Island, Hong Kong, also called "Kat O"
Crooked Island, Bahamas
Crooked Island (Michigan) in Lake Huron